The 2020 Sporting Kansas City season was the twenty-fifth season of the team's existence in Major League Soccer and the tenth year played under the Sporting Kansas City moniker. The season was suspended on March 12, for 30 days, due to the COVID-19 pandemic. Following that decision, on March 19 Major League Soccer extended its temporary suspension until May 10. Following that decision, on April 17 Major League Soccer extended its temporary suspension until June 8.

Summary

Preseason

Sporting will spend the whole of its pre-season training camp in Scottsdale, Arizona for the sixth straight year, led by Coach and Sporting Director Peter Vermes. From January 19 to Feb 1 and from Feb. 8–22 the club will practice in Scottsdale before kicking off its 25th season in Major League Soccer on Feb 29 or March 1.

Current roster

Player movement

In 

Per Major League Soccer and club policies terms of the deals do not get disclosed.

Draft picks 
Draft picks are not automatically signed to the team roster. Only trades involving draft picks and executed after the start of 2020 MLS SuperDraft will be listed in the notes.

Out

Loans 
Per Major League Soccer and club policies terms of the deals do not get disclosed.

In

Out

Competitions

Preseason
Kickoff times are in CST (UTC-06) unless shown otherwise

Preseason schedule announced on January 14, 2020.

Visit Tucson Sun Cup

MLS is Back Tournament

Group stage

Knockout stage

Regular season 

Kickoff times are in CDT (UTC-06) unless shown otherwise

MLS Cup Playoffs

Standings

Western Conference

Overall table

Results by round

Player statistics

Squad appearances and goals
Last updated on September 23, 2020.

|-
! colspan="14" style="background:#dcdcdc; text-align:center"|Goalkeepers

|-
! colspan="14" style="background:#dcdcdc; text-align:center"|Defenders

|-
! colspan="14" style="background:#dcdcdc; text-align:center"|Midfielders

|-
! colspan="14" style="background:#dcdcdc; text-align:center"|Forwards

|-
! colspan=14 style=background:#dcdcdc; text-align:center| Players who have made an appearance or had a squad number this season but have left the club
|-
|}

0+1 means player did came on as a sub once. 1+1 means player started once and came on as a sub once.
The group stage matches of the MLS is Back Tournament count as regular season matches and data will be listed under Regular Season.

Top scorers 

As of September 23, 2020

Disciplinary record 

As of March 1, 2021

Injury record

References

Sporting Kansas City seasons
Sporting
Sporting Kansas City
Sporting Kansas